Klondike Corner is a census-designated place (CDP) in the town of New Boston in Hillsborough County, New Hampshire, United States. As of the 2020 census the population was 652.

Geography
The CDP is in the southeastern part of New Boston and includes the original hamlet of Klondike Corner in the southeast corner, at the intersection of Chestnut Hill Road and Bedford Road. The CDP is bordered to the east by the town of Bedford and to the south by the New Boston Air Force Station. Bedford Road forms the northeastern and northern borders of the CDP, and Old County Road and Laurel Lane form the western edge.

Bog Brook, flowing through the eastern part of the community, drains the CDP and runs north to the Piscataquog River in Goffstown, part of the Merrimack River watershed.

Demographics

References

Census-designated places in New Hampshire
Census-designated places in Hillsborough County, New Hampshire